Schleiermacher is the name of:

 Artur Shleyermakher, Russian football player
 Friedrich Schleiermacher, German theologian and philosopher
 Ruth Schleiermacher, speedskater
 Steffen Schleiermacher, composer

See also 
 Schleier

German-language surnames
Occupational surnames